The Guy and Margaret Fleming House, also known as Torrey Pines Reserve Ranger Residence, is a historic house in the Torrey Pines State Reserve, California. It was added to the National Register of Historic Places in June 1998. 

Guy Fleming was a naturalist and the park custodian of Torrey Pines Reserve. He served as a guide during the Panama-California Exposition of 1915-16 and was noted for his conservation efforts throughout California, in particular his work founding the Anza Desert, Cuyamaca, and Palomar State Parks.

Margaret Eddy Fleming (1888-1977) was a landscape artist and naturalist. The Margaret Fleming Nature Trail in the Torrey Pines Reserve Extension Area was named in her honor.

The two-story wood-framed home was built in 1927 by Fleming and his father in the Pueblo Revival style.

References

External links

Historic house museums in California
Pueblo Revival architecture
Historic preservation in the United States
Landmarks in San Diego
National Register of Historic Places in San Diego County, California